The Little Muskingum River is a tributary of the Ohio River, approximately 65 mi (105 km) long, in southeast Ohio in the United States.

It rises in the hill country of Monroe County, approximately 5 mi (8 km) northwest of the Ohio River and 8 mi (13 km) southeast of Woodsfield. It flows southwest, in a tight meandering course, roughly parallel to, and staying within 8 mi (13 km) of the Ohio. It passes Rinard Mills and Dart, and joins the Ohio approximately 5 mi (8 km) southeast of Marietta, Ohio and the mouth of the Muskingum River, which enters the Ohio from the northwest. Duck Creek enters the Ohio between the mouth of the Muskingum and Little Muskingum.

All except the last 2 mi (3.2 km) of the river are within Wayne National Forest.

See also
List of rivers of Ohio
Sacket Run, tributary of Little Muskingum River

References

Rivers of Ohio
Tributaries of the Ohio River
Rivers of Monroe County, Ohio
Rivers of Washington County, Ohio